Futsal at the 2010 South American Games in Medellín was held from March 20 to March 26. All games were played in Medellín, Colombia and the Gold medal was won by Brazil

Medal summary

Medal table

References

2010 South American Games
2010 in futsal
2010